Finally Alone (Konečně sami) is a 1940 comedy film from occupied Czechoslovakia, directed by Miroslav Cikán. It stars  Růžena Nasková, Nataša Gollová, Miroslav Homola.

References

External links
 at the Internet Movie Database

1940 films
Czechoslovak comedy films
1940 comedy films
Films directed by Miroslav Cikán
Czechoslovak black-and-white films
1940s Czech films